The Flying Car (German: Das fliegende Auto) is a 1920 German silent fantasy film directed by and starring Harry Piel.

The film's sets were designed by the art director Albert Korell .

Cast
In alphabetical order
Friedrich Berger
Richard Georg
Max Laurence
Harry Piel
Fritz Schroeter
Margot Thisset
Thilde Thönessen
Adolf Wenter
William Zeiske

References

External links

Films of the Weimar Republic
Films directed by Harry Piel
German silent feature films
1920s fantasy films
German fantasy films
German black-and-white films
1920s German films